Abdelmalik Yahyaoui better known by the stage name Larry (born 10 February 1998 in Strasbourg, France) is a French rapper of Moroccan descent. Most famous for his song "Woin Woin" featuring rapper RK, he released his album Cité blanche in 2020. He is signed to Columbia Records in addition to running his own label Gothvm Records.

Career
Yahyaoui grew up in Elsau suburb of Strasbourg and was active in many sports including football, boxing, judo. He also was part of a hip hop dance group. His father Badr Yahyaoui worked in arts and became his manager, and his mother Soumia Yahyaoui working in restaurant became is responsible for signings and the company's record label Gothvm Reords. Larry started rapping at 19 and posted a number of freestyle materials he called Freeberiz on Instagram and was dedicated to one of his close friends imprisoned at the time. Encouraged by the success, he established his record label Gothvm Records releasing more freestyles in 2019. After releasing a few tracks, like "Pasta", "Beatles" and "Gamme" and freestyle series "Abattue" and the singles "Gaz" and "Sacoche" in June 2019, he gained huge viewing on social networks. 

Larry signed with Sony Music and affiliate Columbia Records with whom he released notably "Woin Woin" in collaboration with French rapper RK that became his biggest charting single in France and Belgium and certified platinum in France. It also earned him a performance at Planète Rock on Skyrock where he performed freestyles for a full week with guests Rémy, RK and 100 Blaze. He released further freestyle materials with Booska-P followed by his studio album Cité blanche on 31 January 2020, that peaked at number 6 in French albums chart. Cité blanche (meaning white city in French) refers to the traffic of cocaine in the French suburbs. The album was certified gold in August 2020. He also toured in France, Belgium and Switzerland for promoting the album.

Discography

Albums

Singles

Featured in

Other collaborations
2018: Eafia & Larry - "Mbappé"
2019: DJ Weedim feat. Larry - "Eazy Mélo"
2020: Rémy feat. Larry - "Grammes" (on the soundtrack of Validé)
2020: Shotas feat. Larry - "B" (on muxtape Capuché 2 by Shotas)
2020: 24kGoldn feat. Larry - "City of Angels" (Larry Remix)
2020: Ashafar feat. Larry - "Medellín"

Other charting songs

Other releases
2018: Freeberiz #1, #2, #3, #4
2018: "Cible" (Hors-Série #1)
2018: "Bling" (on the compilation Favelas II)
2018: "Abattue" (Hors-Série #2)
2019: "Pasta"
2019: "Hood"
2019: "Booska Beriz"
2019: "Gamme"
2019: "Beatles"

References

French rappers
1998 births
Living people
Musicians from Strasbourg
French people of Moroccan descent
21st-century French musicians